Linden is an unincorporated community in Latah County, in the U.S. state of Idaho.

History
Linden experienced a minor gold rush in the late 1870s. A post office called Linden was established in 1889, and remained in operation until it was discontinued in 1929. The community was named after Linden, Missouri.

References

Unincorporated communities in Latah County, Idaho
Unincorporated communities in Idaho